Ysgol Maes Garmon is an 11–18 mixed, Welsh-medium community secondary school and sixth form in Mold, Flintshire, Wales. It was established in 1961 and is the only Welsh-medium High school in Flintshire.

It shares some of its facilities with Alun School.

Although Ysgol Maes Garmon is a Welsh-medium school, it welcomes pupils who cannot yet speak the Welsh language, running an immersion programme to help students from English-medium primary schools to learn Welsh. The school has been active in supporting Welsh-medium education. In 2016 a documentary, OMG: Ysgol Ni!, was filmed at the school by S4C.

As of 2021, the school's most recent inspection by Estyn was in December 2019, with judgements of Adequate and needs improvement for Standards, for Teaching and learning experiences and for Leadership and management; and Good for Wellbeing and attitudes to learning and for Care, support and guidance.

Notable alumni 
 Gareth Glyn, composer and radio broadcaster
 Rhys Ifans, actor and musician
 Nia Jones, athlete
 Rhodri Meilir, actor
 Nic Parry, commentator and presenter
 Rob Roberts, member of Parliament

References

External links 
 

Secondary schools in Flintshire
Welsh-language schools
Educational institutions established in 1961
1961 establishments in Wales
Mold, Flintshire